Thambi Ramaiah is an Indian actor, director and comedian who works in the Tamil film industry. He has also worked occasionally as a lyricist. He directed three films, Manu Needhi (2000), Indiralohathil Na Azhagappan (2008) and Maniyaar Kudumbam (2018).

Career

Thambi Ramaiah was born in Rarapuram village in Pudukkottai, and initially entered the film industry hoping to become a screenwriter. His father was a poet and a fiction writer and his mother was a housewife, while Ramaiah was their eldest child. He earned pocket money during his school days by writing love letters for his classmates. He also had an interest in lyric writing, often writing lyrics for parody versions of popular songs, while becoming trained in various instruments including the harmonium and guitar. At the age of 20, he moved to Chennai and tried to make a breakthrough into the film industry, but was hindered by his lack of contacts and instead worked for a private company for nine years. He got a break in 1994 and took up a job as a dialogue writer for a serial on Sun TV, doubling up as an assistant director, script writer and lyricist. He then earned opportunities to work as an assistant director in films directed by T. Rajender and P. Vasu, and he considers the latter his teacher of screenplay-writing. He made a cameo acting appearance in Vasu's film Malabar Police (1999) in a scene featuring Goundamani. The following year, he made his directorial début with Manu Needhi (2000), which starred Murali and Napolean. He carried on playing supporting roles in films as well as writing comedy tracks, also directing the Vadivelu-starrer Indiralohathil Na Azhagappan (2008).

He made a breakthrough as an actor portraying a friendly cop in Prabhu Solomon's romantic film Mynaa (2010) and won the National Film Award for Best Supporting Actor for his performance. He subsequently won positive reviews for his performances in films including Saattai, Kumki (2012) and Kathai Thiraikathai Vasanam Iyakkam (2014). At the peak of his career in 2013–2014, he worked for up to four films a day, while being on locations for close to 25 days a month. He also served as his own manager and often was in charge of his own make-up and costumes in films.

In 2014, he announced plans to introduce his son, Umapathy Ramaiah, as an actor. His son later made his debut in Adhagappattathu Magajanangalay (2016).

Filmography

As actor

Web series

As director

As singer

References

External links

Living people
Indian male film actors
Tamil male actors
Best Supporting Actor National Film Award winners
Tamil film directors
Tamil screenwriters
Tamil comedians
Male actors from Tamil Nadu
21st-century Indian male actors
21st-century Indian film directors
Film directors from Tamil Nadu
1956 births